Manuel Gutiérrez Aragón (born 2 January 1940) is a Spanish screenwriter and film director. His 1973 film Habla, mudita was entered into the 23rd Berlin International Film Festival. In 1977, he won the Silver Bear for Best Director for Camada negra at the 27th Berlin International Film Festival. His 1979 film El corazón del bosque was entered into the 29th Berlin International Film Festival. Two years later, his film Maravillas was entered into the 31st Berlin International Film Festival. His 1982 film Demons in the Garden was entered into the 13th Moscow International Film Festival where it won the FIPRESCI Prize. In 1991 he was a member of the jury at the 17th Moscow International Film Festival.

In 1995 his film King of the River was entered into the 45th Berlin International Film Festival.

Gutiérrez Aragón was elected to Seat F of the Real Academia Española on 16 April 2015, he took up his seat on 24 January 2016.

Cinema

References

External links 
Official site
 

1940 births
Living people
People from Torrelavega
Film directors from Cantabria
Spanish film directors
Spanish male screenwriters
Members of the Royal Spanish Academy
Silver Bear for Best Director recipients
20th-century Spanish screenwriters
20th-century Spanish male writers
21st-century Spanish screenwriters